The Serra da Baitaca State Park is a state park in the state of Paraná, Brazil.

Location

The Serra da Baitaca State Park is divided between the municipalities of Piraquara and Quatro Barras in the state of Paraná (state).
The larger part is in Quatro Barras, with a narrow southern extension into Piraquara.
The state park is considered the most important practical mountaineering school in  Paraná, and one of the most important in Brazil.
The park holds the sources of the Iguaçu River, and also holds springs that supply the city of Curitiba.

History

The purpose was to conserve a sample of montane and high montane dense rainforest biome, and to promote activities that do not affect the ecosystem and support conservation.
It was one of four state parks created on that date by the governor, Jaime Lerner, who also expanded two conservation units.
The state park is part of the Lagamar mosaic of conservation units.
It is administered by the Instituto Ambiental do Paraná.
The consultative council was created on 11 September 2009 to contribute to planning and implementation of the management plan.
As of 2013 there was still no management plan through which the considerable tourism potential of the park could be realized.

Notes

Sources

State parks of Brazil
Protected areas of Paraná (state)
2002 establishments in Brazil